Favorit may refer to:

 Berliner Fußball-Club Favorit, a German football club succeeded by VfL Nord Berlin following World War II
 El Favorit, a Catalan spin-off of the TV show 100 Greatest Britons
 Favorit FM, a Romanian radio station operated by Centrul Național Media
 Favorit TV, a Romanian TV channel operated by Centrul Naţional Media
 S-300PMU-2 "Favorit", a type of S-300 system

Transport 
 Amazon Favorit, a cheaper model of the Volvo Amazon
 Avion F-1 Favorit, a light sporting biplane for aerobatics also known as the Avion MAI F-1

 Favorit (bicycle), a line of Czech bicycles
 Škoda Favorit, a line of Czech cars
 Adler Favorit, a passenger car introduced early in 1929 by the Frankfurt auto-maker, Adler

See also 
 Favorite (disambiguation)
 Favor (disambiguation)
 Favorites (disambiguation)
 Favorite Son (disambiguation)